The Haval H7 is a compact SUV by Haval that was launched on the Chinese car market in early 2016.

Overview
The Haval H7 was unveiled to the Chinese market in 2015, and pricing for the H7 ranges from 125,000 yuan to 175,000 yuan. 

The engine of the Haval H7 and Haval H7L is a 2.0 liter 231hp (170kW)/ 350Nm direct-injection turbo-petrol four-cylinder engine linked to a six-speed dual-clutch transmission.

Australian market
The Australian market Haval H7 debuted at the first quarter of 2018. While the Haval H7 was unveiled in five-seat H7 and seven-seat H7L (Long) models for the domestic Chinese market, only the seven-seat version called H7 is offered in Australia, losing the "Long" moniker for the Australian market. No all-wheel drive version of the Haval H7 is available for Australia with front-wheel-drive being the only option. The top-of-the-line LUX trim of the H7 is fully loaded with features including a panoramic sunroof, automatic tailgate, 12.3-inch instrument panel display and semi-autonomous parking.

Safety features of the Haval H7 for the Australian market include blind-spot monitors, lane changing assist, rear cross-traffic alert sensors, autonomous emergency braking, forward collision warning, and a 360-degree camera.

Wheels for the H7 offered include either 19- or 20-inch alloys, depending on the trim levels. The H7 is also running 235/55 R19 or 255/45 R20 tires.

Haval H7L
A seven-seater mid-size Haval H7L was also available in Red Label trim shortly after, with almost 200mm of extra length.

References

External links

H7
Compact sport utility vehicles
Crossover sport utility vehicles
Mid-size sport utility vehicles
All-wheel-drive vehicles
Cars introduced in 2015
Cars of China